Sweet November is a 2001 American romantic drama film based in San Francisco directed by Pat O'Connor and starring Keanu Reeves and Charlize Theron. The film is loosely based on the 1968 film Sweet November written by Herman Raucher, which starred Anthony Newley and Sandy Dennis; with some differences in plot. 

Sweet November was released on February 16, 2001. It received negative reviews from critics and grossed $65 million worldwide.

Plot
Nelson Moss is a workaholic advertising executive that meets Sara Deever, a woman very different from anyone he has met before. His attempt to get an answer from her on his driving test leads to her failing due to cheating. She beguiles him and continually asks him to spend a month with her on the promise that she will change his life for the better. On the first night of November, after Nelson is fired and dumped on the same day, she sleeps with him, and the next day Chaz, a close friend of Sara's, arrives and refers to Nelson as Sara's "November".

Throughout November, the two experience happy times together and fall in love. Nelson examines his life and past, and befriends a 10-year-old fatherless child named Abner. Eventually, he realizes he is in love with Sara and asks her to marry him. It is revealed that Sara has terminal cancer, non-Hodgkin lymphoma. Because she cannot bear to have Nelson experience her death, she asks him to leave. Sara tells Chaz that Nelson proposed to her. Chaz says that it wasn't the first time that a man had proposed, implying Sara has had numerous "months" before. Sara confirms this but claims it was the first time she had wanted to say yes. She decides she will not continue the relationship to protect Nelson from being hurt. Nelson complies, but then stages a surprise return during the Thanksgiving holiday, giving her gifts that remind her of their happy times.

They stay together for one more day; he posts November calendars all over her apartment walls, saying it can always be November for them. They make love, but the next morning, Nelson finds Sara is dressed. She asks him to leave, and he sees she has taken down the calendars. Sara runs out of her apartment with Nelson chasing her in the street until finally she stops along a foot bridge to the park entrance. There, Sara asks Nelson to let her go so that he will always have happy memories of her, and explains that this is how she needs to be remembered. She will return home to her family (whom she had been avoiding) and face her last days.

Sara then blindfolds Nelson, leads him into the park, and gives him a last kiss. Nelson takes off the blindfold and sees that he is alone in the park he and Sara went on one of their first dates. His eyes fill with tears.

Cast

Music

Reception

Box office
The film opened at number 4 at the North American box office making $11,015,226 in its opening weekend behind Recess: School's Out, Down to Earth and Hannibal. It ultimately grossed only $25.2 million domestically with an additional $40.4 million overseas to a total of $65.7 million worldwide.

Critical response
On Rotten Tomatoes the film holds an approval rating of 15% based on 99 reviews, with an average rating of 3.6/10. The website's critics consensus states: "Schmaltzy and manipulative, Sweet November suffers from an implausible plot and non-existent chemistry between its leads." At Metacritic, the film has a weighted average score of 27 out of 100, based on 30 critics, indicating "generally unfavorable reviews". Audiences polled by CinemaScore gave the film an average grade of "B" on an A+ to F scale.

Todd McCarthy of Variety called it: "A contrived but entirely workable premise is given a well-tooled treatment in Sweet November, a femme-slanted doomed romance with a heavily calculated feel to it."
Roger Ebert of the Chicago Sun-Times gave it 1 out of 4, and wrote: "Passes off pathological behavior as romantic bliss. It's about two sick and twisted people playing mind games and calling it love."
Peter Travers of Rolling Stone warned: "Beware all male viewers who enter here, you are in chick-movie hell."

The film was nominated for three Golden Raspberry Awards, including Worst Remake or Sequel, Worst Actor (Keanu Reeves), and Worst Actress (Charlize Theron). It is listed on Golden Raspberry Award founder John Wilson's book The Official Razzie Movie Guide as one of the 100 Most Enjoyably Bad Movies Ever Made.

References

External links
 
 
 
 
 

2001 films
2001 romantic drama films
American romantic drama films
Films directed by Pat O'Connor
Remakes of American films
Films scored by Christopher Young
Films about cancer
Films set in San Francisco
Thanksgiving in films
Films produced by Elliott Kastner
2000s English-language films
Warner Bros. films
2000s American films